Samuel Wallace Speck, Jr. was a former member of the Ohio Senate, where he served from 1977 to 1983. He represented the 20th District.

Education
Speck earned his bachelor's degree from Muskingum University and his master's and doctoral degrees from Harvard University.

Activities 
Speck pointed to several provisions in Great Lakes Compact that he believes are violated by the Lake Erie water-use bill.

Awards
 2004 – National Governors Association's Annual Award for Distinguished Service in State Government

References

Living people
Muskingum University alumni
Harvard University alumni
Republican Party Ohio state senators
1937 births